State Road 297 (SR 297) is a north–south divided highway northwest of Pensacola known locally as Pine Forest Road. The road serves as a connector between Mobile Highway (US 90/SR 10) and Interstate 10 (SR 8) in the Pensacola metropolitan area. The road also extends into the northern Pensacola suburbs, where it ends at an intersection with Nine Mile Road (Alt US 90/SR 10). The road is also the main truck route to Pensacola Naval Air Station.

Major intersections

References

External links

FDOT Map of Escambia County (including SR 297)

297
297